Cassis, Cap Lombard, Opus 196 is an oil on canvas painting of 1889 by the French artist Paul Signac. It depicts the village of Cassis. He was very enthused with the landscape; he made five paintings in Cassis. Signac described this painting in a letter to Vincent van Gogh: "White, blue, orange, harmonically dispersed in pretty undulations. All around mountains with rhythmic curves."

See also
List of paintings by Paul Signac

References

External links

1889 paintings
Paintings by Paul Signac